Sir David Rolland Spedding  (7 March 1943 – 13 June 2001) was Head of the British Secret Intelligence Service (MI6) from 1994 to 1999.

Early life
David Spedding was the son of a Border Regiment lieutenant colonel, and grew up comfortably middle class. He was initially educated at Sherborne School and then read history at Hertford College, Oxford.

Career
David Spedding joined the Secret Intelligence Service in 1967, while a postgraduate student at Oxford. He then attended the Middle East Center for Arabic Studies in Beirut, becoming a specialist on Middle East affairs. He also served in Santiago and Abu Dhabi.

In 1971 Spedding was named as the local SIS station commander in Lebanon, and was later posted to Abu Dhabi in 1977. Following his Middle East Directorate appointment in 1983, he was made the Amman Jordan station head, and was subsequently commended in that position for uncovering an Abu Nidal plan to assassinate the Queen during an upcoming Jordan visit. For this he was made Commander of the Royal Victorian Order.

In 1993, Spedding became Director of Requirements and Operations. In 1994 he became Chief of the Service, becoming the first chief to have never served in the armed forces, and the youngest to have held the position to that date. During Spedding's tenure the SIS faced some degree of negative publicity due to unauthorized disclosures in the wake of Richard Tomlinson's dismissal.

Sir David Spedding died of lung cancer on 13 June 2001, aged 58.

References

External links
Photograph

1943 births
2001 deaths
Alumni of Hertford College, Oxford
Commanders of the Royal Victorian Order
Knights Commander of the Order of St Michael and St George
Chiefs of the Secret Intelligence Service
Officers of the Order of the British Empire
People educated at Sherborne School
Post–Cold War spies